Bruce 'Lapa' Stewart (1941–2012), an Indigenous Australian, was a rugby league footballer in the New South Wales Rugby League, playing as a winger.

A La Perouse local, Stewart played for South Sydney in the junior and lower grades before joining the Eastern Suburbs club in 1967, where he scored 10 tries from his 24 appearances. He also represented NSW Country firsts.

Stewart died on 2 April 2012.

His son, Corey Stewart, also played for Eastern Suburbs.

References

 Alan Whiticker and Glen Hudson, The Encyclopedia Of Rugby League Players

1941 births
2012 deaths
Australian rugby league players
Indigenous Australian rugby league players
Place of birth missing
Place of death missing
Sydney Roosters players
Country New South Wales rugby league team players
Rugby league wingers